Shane Ramsay (born 3 December 1985) is a Barbadian cricketer. He played in two first-class matches for the Barbados cricket team in 2009.

See also
 List of Barbadian representative cricketers

References

External links
 

1985 births
Living people
Barbadian cricketers
Barbados cricketers